FirstBank Building, part of the Palmer Center Complex, is a class A high-rise office building in Colorado Springs, Colorado. It is the second tallest building in Colorado Springs, and the second tallest building outside of the Denver metropolitan area. The building was known as the Holly Sugar Building when Holly Sugar Corporation was headquartered there.

References

Buildings and structures in Colorado Springs, Colorado
Bank buildings in Colorado
Skyscrapers in Colorado
Skyscraper office buildings in Colorado
Office buildings completed in 1967